This is a list of some of the chicken breeds considered in Spain to be wholly or partly of Spanish origin. Some may have complex or obscure histories, so inclusion here does not necessarily imply that a breed is predominantly or exclusively Spanish.

References

Chicken